The British Journal of Community Nursing is a monthly nursing journal covering clinical and professional issues related to nursing in the home.

It is indexed on MEDLINE and Scopus.

References

General nursing journals
Publications established in 1996
English-language journals
Monthly journals